The women's 400 metres hurdles event at the 2005 European Athletics U23 Championships was held in Erfurt, Germany, at Steigerwaldstadion on 15 and 16 July.

Medalists

Results

Final
16 July

Heats
15 July
Qualified: first 3 in each heat and 2 best to the Final

Heat 1

Heat 2

Participation
According to an unofficial count, 12 athletes from 8 countries participated in the event.

 (2)
 (1)
 (2)
 (1)
 (3)
 (1)
 (1)
 (1)

References

400 metres hurdles
400 metres hurdles at the European Athletics U23 Championships